Diana Bracho (born Diana Guadalupe Bracho y Bordes Mangel; 12 December 1944, in Mexico City, Mexico) is a Mexican actress.

Early life
Diana Bracho is the daughter of actor/director Julio Bracho, the niece of actress Andrea Palma and the aunt of actor Julio Bracho (named after his grandfather).

Career
She made her film debut as a child actress in two of her father's films: San Felipe (1949) and Immaculate Conception (1950). She studied Philosophy and Letters in New York. She debuted professionally on stage in the play Israfel by Abelardo Rodríguez alongside Sergio Bustamante. Her television debut was in 1973. Diana Bracho won the Silver Ariel award twice, the first time in 1973.

She won her second Silver Ariel for El infierno, de todos tan temído and was nominated for Best Actress for Letters from Marusia (1976) and Entre Pancho Villa y una mujer desnuda (1996). On August 6, 2002 she was appointed president of the Academia Mexicana de Artes y Ciencias Cinematográficas. She has been involved in co-productions with countries such as The Chess Player (France); Edmilson (Germany), The Dogs of War (Britain), The Aleph (Italy), The legend of the Drum (Spain), Antonieta (Spain) and On Wings of Eagles (United States).

She starred in several television series and soap operas, notably as Leonora Navarro in the telenovela Cuna de lobos (1986), produced by Carlos Tellez. She also played the villainous  Evangelina Vizcaíno in  Cadenas de Amargura (1991), produced by Carlos Sotomayor. She played the role of the black widow in the third season of Mujeres Asesinas. Though Diana was confirmed to star in Salvador Mejía's new telenovela: La tempestad, she rejected her participation.

Filmography

Films

Television performances

Awards and nominations

References

External links

Diana Bracho official website
Biografía de Diana Bracho  

Living people
Mexican telenovela actresses
Mexican television actresses
Mexican film actresses
Mexican stage actresses
Actresses from Mexico City
20th-century Mexican actresses
21st-century Mexican actresses
1944 births
Golden Ariel Award winners